Álvaro Fabián Lara Saldías (26 August 1984 – 13 August 2011) was a Chilean footballer who played as a striker. His last club was Rangers de Talca of the Primera B in the 2010 season.

Career
Lara began his football career in Universidad Católica and was promoted to the first adult team in 2004. Two years later, he left the club and in January 2007, Álvaro signed for his local village team Deportes Linares. After an entire season in Third Division with Linares, he was scouted by Deportes Concepción and they signed him the next season. However, despite his performances with the Lions of Ñielol, Lara abandoned the club for financial problems and later he joined Curicó Unido of the Primera B, where he won the promotion title. In 2010, he signed for Rangers, but he was released at the end of the season.

On 13 August 2011, Lara, while travelling with two friends, crashed his car into a wagon driven by a drunk driver. The accident occurred along Chile Route 5, in San Javier. He was taken to Regional Hospital of the Maule, where he died as a result of his injuries.

Honours

Club
Universidad Católica
 Primera División de Chile (2): 2005 Clausura

Curicó Unido
 Primera B (1): 2008

References

External links
 Álvaro Lara at Football-Lineups
 

1984 births
2011 deaths
Chilean footballers
Chilean Primera División players
Club Deportivo Universidad Católica footballers
Deportes Concepción (Chile) footballers
Primera B de Chile players
Curicó Unido footballers
Rangers de Talca footballers
Association football forwards
People from Linares
Road incident deaths in Chile